Government of Chhattisgarh also known as the  State Government of Chhattisgarh, or locally as  State Government, is the supreme governing authority of the Indian state of Chhattisgarh and its 33 districts. It consists of an executive, led by the Governor of Chhattisgarh, a judiciary and a legislative branch.

Like other states in India, the head of state of Chhattisgarh is the governor, appointed by the president of India on the advice of the central government. His or her post is largely ceremonial. The chief minister is the head of government and is vested with most of the executive powers. Raipur is the capital of Chhattisgarh, and houses the Chhattisgarh Vidhan Sabha (Legislative Assembly) and the secretariat. The Chhattisgarh High Court, located Bilaspur, has jurisdiction over the whole state.

The present Legislative Assembly of Chhattisgarh is unicameral, consisting of 91 Members of Legislative Assembly (M.L.A) (90 elected and one nominated). Its term is 5 years, unless sooner dissolved.

List of Current Ministers 

 Ajeet Pramod Kumar Jogi, Indian National Congress Party
 Dr. Raman Singh, Bhartiya Janta Party

Council of Ministers

References

External links